The 1980 Gillette Cup was an English limited overs county cricket tournament held between 2 July and 6 September 1980. It was the eighteenth and final Gillette Cup before it was renamed as the NatWest Trophy in 1981. Middlesex won the tournament, defeating Surrey by 7 wickets in the final at Lord's.

Format
The seventeen first-class counties were joined by five Minor Counties: Cornwall, Devon, Durham, Oxfordshire and Suffolk.  The tournament also marked the first time that Ireland were included.  Teams who won in the first round progressed to the second round. The winners in the second round then progressed to the quarter-final stage.  Winners from the quarter-finals then progressed to the semi-finals from which the winners then went on to the final at Lord's which was held on 2 September 1980.

First round

Second round

Quarter-finals

Semi-finals

Final

References

External links
CricketArchive tournament page

Friends Provident Trophy seasons
Gillette Cup, 1980